Space is the third extended play (EP) by British YouTuber and rapper KSI. It was independently released for digital download and streaming on 30 June 2017. The EP was preceded by its first and only single, "Creature".

Background 
In February 2017, KSI "blacked out" all of his YouTube and social media accounts, as well as deleting around 600 YouTube videos, worth over two billion views, and deleting all of his social media posts. On 23 February 2017, in an interview with DramaAlert, KSI explained his actions, confirming that he wasn't "promoting anything". He continued to say that he doesn't "care about the fame or the money" and he is "sick of trying to portray himself as a certain thing which he isn't", describing himself as being "a clown for many years". He confirmed that he would not be uploading to YouTube for the foreseeable future.

Speaking to GRM Daily in July 2017 about his break from YouTube, KSI said, "I feel like with the whole KSI thing, it was sick don't get me wrong, I've enjoyed making all these videos, entertaining people, making people laugh and all that. But it's kind of to the point where I've been there, done that, now I wanna do what I wanna do. I felt like an evolution was needed to prove to people that I can do what I feel is necessary in my life, and that was the same feeling with this whole Space EP. I just wanted it to be truthful. I want people to actually see how I was feeling from my eyes about what I was going through". He continued, "I think it was near the end of last year when I was doing a book, a movie, dropped an EP, lots of youtube videos, I was just doing so much it got to the point where I started getting stressed and it really started to hinder me. I started getting ill and everything. It was just a bit too much and I was like "yo, right now what do I wanna do with myself?""

Promotion and release 
Space was independently released for digital download and streaming on 30 June 2017.

Singles 
"Creature" was released as the Lead single from the EP on 23 June 2017. An accompanying music video for the song was released on 27 June 2017.

Track listing

Credits and personnel 
Credits adapted from Tidal.

 KSIsongwriting , vocals 
 DJ Turkishengineering 
 Zagorproduction , songwriting 
 Oscar LoBruttoengineering 
 Swayproduction , songwriting 
 Charles Cookproduction , songwriting , engineering 
 GK Beatsproduction , songwriting 
 Sammy Sosoproduction , songwriting

Charts

Release history

Notes

References 

2017 EPs
KSI albums
RBC Records albums
BMG Rights Management albums